Buffalo (also known as French) is an unincorporated community in Randolph Township, Ohio County, in the U.S. state of Indiana.

History
The post office which once operated in Buffalo was called French. This post office opened in 1897, and was discontinued in 1905.

Geography

References

Unincorporated communities in Ohio County, Indiana
Unincorporated communities in Indiana